Anchieta's frog may refer to:

 Anchieta's ridged frog (Ptychadena anchietae), a frog in the family Ptychadenidae found in Africa
 Anchieta's tree frog (Leptopelis anchietae), a frog in the family Hyperoliidae endemic to Angola